Fox Entertainment Group was an American entertainment company specialised in filmed entertainment owned by 21st Century Fox. Following the acquisition of 21st Century Fox by Disney, the group's assets were folded into various Disney units. The film studios 20th Century Fox (now known as 20th Century Studios), Fox Searchlight Pictures (now known as Searchlight Pictures) and Blue Sky Studios were transferred to Walt Disney Studios, whilst Fox Star Studios (now known as Star Studios) transferred to Walt Disney Direct-to-Consumer & International.

Its former owner, 21st Century Fox, was formerly known as News Corporation, which acquired all the stock of Fox Entertainment Group in 2005. In 2013, News Corporation was renamed 21st Century Fox and its publishing assets were spun off into the newly formed News Corp as part of a corporate re-organization.

It was named after William Fox who created the original 20th Century Fox Film Corporation (alongside Joseph M. Schenck and Darryl F. Zanuck).

History
Fox Entertainment Group formed in the 1980s after the purchase of the Metromedia-owned independent stations by the 20th Century Fox film studio, at the time jointly owned by Australian-American media mogul Rupert Murdoch's News Corporation, and Denver billionaire Marvin Davis. These stations would later become the foundation of the Fox television network (launched in October 1986), which would become the foundation of the company (named after the TV network) itself. Not long after the Metromedia deal was made, Murdoch purchased Davis's shares and News Corp assumed full control of the film studio, which was then placed within Fox Entertainment Group.

In 1995, Saban entered into a joint venture with the Fox children's television network to form Fox Kids Worldwide, which was best known for the first ten Power Rangers series. In 1997 it was renamed Fox Family Worldwide. On July 23, 2001, it was announced that Fox Family Worldwide (now ABC Family Worldwide Inc.) would be sold to Disney from News Corporation and businessperson Haim Saban. On October 24, 2001, the sale was completed.

On August 14, 1998, Fox launched an initial public offering as a publicly traded company, trading on the New York Stock Exchange (NYSE,) while Fox Entertainment Group's address has been moved from Los Angeles to New York City. The company has traded on the NYSE since its launch under ticker symbol FOX until its acquisition in 2005 by News Corporation.

In January 2005, shortly after News Corporation reincorporation in the United States, News Corp announced that it was offering $5.9 billion to buy out the remaining 18% of shares in Fox that News Corporation did not already own. The maneuver delisted Fox from the New York Stock Exchange; Fox Entertainment Group traded on the NYSE under the ticker FOX.

In 2012, Rupert Murdoch announced that News Corporation would be split into two publishing and media-oriented companies: a new News Corporation, and 21st Century Fox, which operated the Fox Entertainment Group and 20th Century Fox and other studios. Murdoch considered the name of the new company a way to maintain the 20th Century Fox's heritage as the group advances into the future.

In January 2017, Fox Entertainment Group and 20th Century Fox formed FoxNext, which would handle video game developments, VR experiences and theme park businesses.

After Disney completed the acquisition of the 21st Century Fox assets on March 20, 2019, Fox Entertainment Group assets became Disney properties and are now reorganized under other Disney units. The Fox Entertainment name would later be used by the Fox Corporation for its entertainment assets.

Units

Transferred to The Walt Disney Studios
 20th Century Fox
 20th Century Fox Animation
 20th Century Fox Games
 20th Century Fox Television
 Blue Sky Studios
 20th Century Fox Consumer Products
 Fox Family Entertainment
 Fox Stage Productions
 Fox 2000 Pictures
 Fox Searchlight Pictures
 New Regency Productions (80%, joint venture with Regency Enterprises)
 Boom! Studios (minority stake)
 Fox Studios Australia
 Zero Day Fox
 Fox Music

Transferred to Walt Disney Direct-to-Consumer & International
 Fox Star Studios
 Hulu (30%)
 Hulu Documentary Films
 20th Century Fox Home Entertainment
 Fox-Paramount Home Entertainment (joint venture with Paramount Home Media Distribution)

Transferred to Disney Parks, Experiences and Products
 FoxNext
 Aftershock Studios
 20th Century Fox World (licence to Resort World by Genting Group)

See also
 Fox on Demand

References

American companies established in 1990
American companies disestablished in 2019
Defunct television broadcasting companies of the United States
Entertainment companies based in California
Companies based in Los Angeles
Los Angeles Dodgers owners
Former News Corporation subsidiaries
Entertainment companies established in 1990
Entertainment companies disestablished in 2019
Mass media companies established in 1990
Mass media companies disestablished in 2019
1990 establishments in California
2019 disestablishments in California
Defunct mass media companies of the United States